Elaine (Helaine, Oisine) or Elizabeth (Eliabel, Elizabel, Elizabet, Heliabel, Helizabel), also known as Amite (Amide, Amides, Anite, Aude, Enite), and identified as the "Grail Maiden" or the "Grail Bearer", is a character from Arthurian legend. In the Arthurian chivalric romance tradition, she is the daughter of the Fisher King, King Pelles of Corbenic (Corbenek, Corbin, etc.), and the mother of Galahad from her rape of Lancelot. She should not be confused with Elaine of Astolat, a different woman who too fell in love with Lancelot.

Origin
Her character is derived from the earlier (and later separate) figure of Percival's sister, and possibly also from that of Arthur's sister. Under her "Amite" name she was furthermore linked to Amice from Meraugis de Portlesguez. Roger Sherman Loomis's work The Grail: From Celtic Symbol to Christian Myth draws a connection between the concept of the feminine "Grail-bearer" and the sovereignty goddess of Ireland, Ériu, who grants the chalice to only the worthy.

Legend
She first appears in the Prose Lancelot, a part of the Vulgate Cycle, as an incredibly beautiful woman named Heliabel but known as Amite (in one spelling variant of these names). Her first significant action is showing the Holy Grail to the near-perfect knight, Sir Lancelot.

In the version as told by Thomas Malory in Le Morte d'Arthur, based on the later Queste part of the Vulgate Cycle, Lady Elaine's father, King Pelles of Corbenic, knew that Lancelot would have a son with Elaine, and that that child would be Galahad, "the most noblest [sic] knight in the world". Moreover, Pelles claims that Galahad will lead a "foreign country...out of danger" and "achieve...the Holy Grail". The source of Pelles' knowledge is undisclosed.

The sorceress Morgan le Fay is jealous of Elaine's beauty, and magically traps her in a boiling bath. After Lancelot rescues her, Elaine falls in love with him, only to find he is already in love with Queen Guinevere and would not knowingly sleep with another woman. In order to seduce Lancelot, Elaine goes to the sorceress Dame Brusen for help. Dame Brusen gives Lancelot wine and Elaine a ring of Guinevere's in order to trick Lancelot into thinking Elaine is Guinevere. The next morning, Lancelot is most displeased to discover that the woman he slept with was not Guinevere. He draws his sword and threatens to kill Elaine, but she tells him that she is pregnant with Galahad and he agrees not to kill her, but instead kisses her. Lancelot departs, and Elaine remains in her father's castle and gives birth to Galahad.

Thereafter, Elaine comes to a feast at King Arthur's court. Lancelot ignores her when he sees her, making her sad because she loves him. She complains of this to Brusen, who tells her that she will, as Malory tells, "undertake that this night he [Lancelot] shall lie with [her]". That night, Brusen brings Lancelot to Elaine, pretending that it is Guinevere that summons him. He goes along, and once again is deceived into sleeping with Elaine. At the same time, however, Guinevere herself had summoned Lancelot and is enraged to discover that he is not in his bedchamber. She hears him talking in his sleep, and finds him in bed with Elaine. She is furious with him and tells him she never wants to see him again. Lancelot goes mad with grief and, naked, jumps out a window and runs away.

Elaine confronts Guinevere as to her treatment of Lancelot. She accuses Guinevere of causing Lancelot's madness and tells her that she is being unnecessarily cruel. After this, she leaves court. Time passes in the story, and Elaine next appears when she finds Lancelot insane in her garden. She brings him to the Grail, which cures him. When he regains his mind, he decides to go with Elaine, and they live together for several years as husband and wife.

Analysis

Elaine of Corbenic is often passed over in favor of Elaine of Astolat. Like the more famous Elaine, Elaine of Corbenic is in love with Lancelot. Yet unlike Astolat, she is successful in both bedding and marrying Lancelot. Despite this, she has been overlooked by most literary analysts. One theory for why she has been so ignored is because of the moral ambiguities of her actions. She does not fit into a neat category of female characters; she is neither good nor evil, but something in between.

Modern stories
Elaine appears in the 1939 novel The Once and Future King, by T.H. White. Although the basic character does not change, there are several key differences. Time is more definitely specified in this version; for instance, when Elaine finds Lancelot in the garden, Galahad is three years old. Additionally, Elaine and Lancelot live together as husband and wife for ten years and actively raise Galahad while Lancelot bears a pseudonym to hide from the court at Camelot. Another key difference between White and Malory is that in White, Lancelot is cured of his insanity by seeing Elaine, but becomes physically sick and is nursed back to health by Elaine. White also chronicles Elaine's final fate, having her commit suicide when it becomes clear that Lancelot will never truly love her or end his obsession with Guinevere. He therefore combines her with the character of Elaine of Astolat, who is not referenced in the novel. Howard Pyle, too, conflates Elaine of Corbenic with Elaine of Astolat in his Arthurian book series.

Elaine also appears as a character in The Mists of Avalon by Marion Zimmer Bradley. In this version, she tricks Lancelot with the help of Morgaine into sleeping with her by making him believe she was Gwenhwyfar. Her father finds out and forces Lancelot to marry her to keep her honor. She and Lancelot, in addition to their son Galahad, have two daughters by the names of Gwenhwyfar and Nimue, who later becomes a priestess of Avalon and is used to trick Merlin into coming with her to the isle to receive punishment for perceived crimes against the Goddess and later drowns herself. Unlike the Elaines in earlier stories, she dies of natural causes later in the book.

A more contemporary novel is Elaine of Corbenic by Tima Z. Newman. Based on Malory's account of the three brief encounters of Launcelot and Elaine in Le Morte d'Arthur, it chronicles Elaine's journey through abandonment to the finding of inner strength and deepening wisdom.

See also
List of Arthurian characters

References

Further reading
Batt, Catherine. Malory's Morte Darthur: Remaking Arthurian Tradition. New York: Palgrave, 2002. Print. (A monograph comparing the relationship between Lancelot and Elaine in Malory with the French text that he based Morte Darthur on, specifically concerning the circumstances of her rape of Lancelot.)
Malory, Sir Thomas. Le Morte Darthur: The Winchester Manuscript. Ed. Helen Cooper. New York: Oxford University Press Inc., 1998. Print. (Chronicles Elaine's seduction of Lancelot, the birth of Galahad, and Lancelot's descent into madness.)
McCarthy, Terence. Reading the Morte Darthur. Cambridge: D. S. Brewer, 1988. Print. (An edited collection comparing the circumstances of Galahad's birth to the trickery involved in Arthur's conception.)
Scala, Elizabeth. “Disarming Lancelot.” Studies in Theology Autumn 2002: 380–403. Magazine. (An article concerning Elaine's power over Lancelot in regards to her seduction.)
Sklar, Elizabeth S. “Malory’s Other(ed) Elaine.” On Arthurian Women: Essays in Memory of Maureen Fries. Bonnie Wheeler and Fiona Tolhurst. Dallas: Scriptorium Press, 2001. 59–70. Print. (An analysis of Elaine of Carbonek’s dismissal from scholarly works because of her complex role in Arthurian literature.)
White, Terence Hanbury. The Once and Future King. New York: G.P. Putnam’s Sons, 1958. Print. (A monograph including modern depiction of Lancelot and Elaine's relationship.)
Suard, François. “The Narration of Youthful Exploits in the Prose Lancelot.” Trans. Arthur F. Crispin. The Lancelot-Grail Cycle: Texts and Transformations. Austin: University of Texas Press, 1994. 67–84. Print. (A description of Galahad's conception and birth.)

External links

  “Arthurian Women.” Jimmy Joe, 1999. Web. 24 June 2006. An encyclopedia article covering her name, beauty, and genealogy.
  “Houses of the Grail Keeper and the Grail Hero.” Jimmy Joe, 1999. Web. 24 June 2006. – An article tracing Elaine of Carbonek’s lineage back to Joseph of Arimathea.
 University of Idaho, 1997. Web. 04/1999. “The Elaines.” – An article detailing the unification of holy bloodlines that occurred when Elaine coerced Lancelot into having sex with her and the subsequent conception of Galahad.

Arthurian characters
Fictional rapists
Mythological princesses